Sir Colville Montgomery Deverell  (21 February 1907 in Dublin, Ireland – 18 December 1995 in Wokingham, Berkshire, England) was an Irish cricketer and colonial administrator.

Cricket

A right-handed batsman, he played just once for the Ireland cricket team, against the MCC in August 1930. He played one first-class match, playing for Dublin University against Northamptonshire in 1926. In the match, he opened the batting with Irish playwright Samuel Beckett.

Politics
Later in life, he served as Governor of the Windward Islands. He was 28th Governor of Mauritius from 2 November 1959 to 10 July 1962.

He was secretary-general of the International Planned Parenthood Federation.

Honours

 Officer of the Order of the British Empire (OBE), 1946
 Commander of the Royal Victorian Order (CVO), 1953
 Companion of the Order of St Michael and St George (CMG), 1955
 Knight Commander of the Order of St Michael and St George (KCMG), 1957
 Knight Grand Cross of the Order of the British Empire (GBE), 1963

References

1907 births
1995 deaths
Cricketers from Dublin (city)
Alumni of Trinity College Dublin
Irish cricketers
Governors of British Mauritius
Commanders of the Royal Victorian Order
Governors of the Windward Islands
Knights Commander of the Order of St Michael and St George
Knights Grand Cross of the Order of the British Empire